is a junction passenger railway station located in the city of Izumisano, Osaka Prefecture, Japan, operated by the West Japan Railway Company (JR West)

Lines
It is also the terminus of the  Kansai Airport Line.

Layout
This station consists two island platforms with four tracks, connected to the station building by a footbridge. The station has a Midori no Madoguchi staffed ticket office.

Platforms

Adjacent stations

|-
!colspan=5|JR West

History
The station opened on June 16, 1930 as a temporary stop, and upgraded to a full passenger station on March 3, 1931. With the privatization of the Japan National Railways (JNR) on April 1, 1987, the station came under the aegis of the West Japan Railway Company. The Kansai Airport Line began operations on June 15, 1994.

Station numbering was introduced in March 2018 with Hineno being assigned station numbers JR-R45 for the Hanwa Line and JR-S45 for the Kansai Airport Line.

Passenger statistics
In fiscal 2019, the station was used by an average of 8816 passengers daily (boarding passengers only)

Surrounding area
 AEON MALL Hineno
 ABC Housing Izumisano Housing Park
 Osaka University of Tourism
 Osaka Prefectural Hineno High School
 Osaka Prefectural Sano High School

See also
 List of railway stations in Japan

External links

JR West home page

References

Railway stations in Osaka Prefecture
Railway stations in Japan opened in 1930
Izumisano